The 1988 Ball State Cardinals football team was an American football team that represented Ball State University in the Mid-American Conference (MAC) during the 1988 NCAA Division I-A football season. In its fourth season under head coach Paul Schudel, the team compiled an 8–3 record (5–3 against conference opponents) and tied for third place in the MAC. The team played its home games at Ball State Stadium in Muncie, Indiana.

The team's statistical leaders included David Riley with 1,886 passing yards, Mark Stevens with 774 rushing yards, Eugene Riley with 457 receiving yards, and Kenny Stucker with 84 points scored.

Schedule

References

Ball State
Ball State Cardinals football seasons
Ball State Cardinals football